Beverly Louise Roberts (May 19, 1914 – July 13, 2009) was an American film and stage actress of the 1930s, as well as a singer and painter. She worked as business executive in the entertainment industry through the 1970s.

Career
Born in Brooklyn, New York, she was first spotted by a Warner Bros. talent scout while singing in a nightclub in 1935. Having performed as a stage actress prior to that, she was signed to a contract with Warner Brothers, starring in her first film in 1936, titled The Singing Kid, in which she appeared opposite Al Jolson. That same year she starred opposite Humphrey Bogart in Two Against the World. In 1937, she starred in God's Country and the Woman, Warners' first Technicolor film, in which she starred opposite George Brent. 

From 1937 to 1939 she starred in sixteen films. In Hollywood she was a friend of Humphrey Bogart, Spencer Tracy, Pat O'Brien and George Jessel.

She and Errol Flynn signed with Warner Bros. on exactly the same day, but she reportedly quit films after losing key parts to other actresses including Bette Davis and Olivia de Havilland. By 1940 she had returned to singing and stage acting. In the late 1940s and early 1950s, she was showcased in numerous radio and television appearances.

In 1954, Roberts returned to New York City and took up a new career as administrator of the "Theater Authority", whose members comprised the five entertainment unions. The organization exercised jurisdiction over performers appearing at charity functions and telethons. Roberts retired in 1977, and moved to Laguna Niguel, California, where she lived out the remainder of her life.

Personal life
Actress Wynne Gibson, whom she had known since they worked together on the 1938 feature Flirting with Fate, followed her to New York; the two shared homes together (both in West Babylon, Long Island, and in Laguna Niguel, California) until Gibson's death in 1987.

In 2000, Roberts was featured in the documentary I Used to Be in Pictures, which revisited Hollywood's early years and featured interviews with former actresses and actors of the day.

In 2002 Roberts was honored by the "Del Mar Theater" in Santa Cruz, California, and her 1936 film, China Clipper, was shown at its grand opening. That same year she was honored at the "Cinecon Film Festival" in Hollywood. 

In her later years, she worked in watercolor painting.

In one of her last public appearances, on October 18, 2006, she was a guest of honor at the 84th Anniversary of the opening of the Egyptian Theater in Hollywood with Sybil Jason, where she answered questions from the audience after a screening of her debut film from 1936, The Singing Kid, which starred Al Jolson.

Death
Roberts died in her sleep on July 13, 2009 at age 95  in her home in Laguna Niguel from natural causes. She never married and had no children.

Filmography

References

External links

 
 
 Fresno Bee obituary
 Interview at ClassicImages.com
 Beverly Roberts - Daily Telegraph obituary
 

1914 births
2009 deaths
American film actresses
American stage actresses
American television actresses
Actresses from New York City
Burials at Forest Lawn Memorial Park (Glendale)
 
American LGBT actors
People from Brooklyn
People from Laguna Niguel, California
20th-century American actresses
20th-century LGBT people
21st-century LGBT people
21st-century American women